Danielle Rose Gibson (born 30 April 2001) is an English cricketer who currently plays for Wales, Western Storm and London Spirit. She plays as a right-arm medium bowler and right-handed lower-order batter. She has previously played for Gloucestershire.

Early life
Gibson was born on 30 April 2001 in Cheltenham, Gloucestershire.

Domestic career
Gibson made her county debut in 2014, for Gloucestershire against Oxfordshire. She scored a duck and did not bowl. The following season, she hit her List A high score, scoring 73 in a victory over Buckinghamshire, and took 3/17 in the same match. In the 2016 Women's County Championship, she was Gloucestershire's leading wicket-taker, with 13 wickets at an average of 9.69, with a best of 4/9 from 7 overs against Norfolk. She had another strong season in 2017, especially with the ball, and took her maiden county five-for, 5/17, against Cornwall.

Gibson moved to Wales ahead of the 2018 season, and was their joint-leading wicket-taker in the 2018 Women's Twenty20 Cup, with 9 wickets. In 2019, she hit her first half-century for her new side, scoring 57 in a victory over Essex. She played two matches for Wales in the 2021 Women's Twenty20 Cup, scoring 32 runs and taking 3 wickets.

Gibson was also in the Western Storm squad in the Women's Cricket Super League between 2017 and 2019. Whilst she did not play a match in 2017, in 2018 she was ever-present as her side reached the semi-final. She took 5 wickets at an average of 27.20. She only appeared in one match in 2019 due to injury.

In 2020, Gibson continued to play for Western Storm in the 2020 Rachael Heyhoe Flint Trophy. She appeared in one match, scoring 33* in a victory over Sunrisers. In December 2020, it was announced that Gibson was one of the 41 female cricketers that had signed a full-time domestic contract. She continued playing for Storm in 2021, taking 3 wickets in the Rachael Heyhoe Flint Trophy and 7 wickets in the Charlotte Edwards Cup. She also played for London Spirit in the inaugural season of The Hundred, scoring 108 runs at a strike rate of 180.00, as well as taking 3 wickets. She was ever-present for Western Storm in 2022, across the Charlotte Edwards Cup and the Rachael Heyhoe Flint Trophy. She took six wickets in the Charlotte Edwards Cup at an average of 25.66, as well as scoring 96 runs. She was Storm's second-highest run-scorer in the Rachael Heyhoe Flint Trophy, with 176 runs including half-centuries against Northern Diamonds and North West Thunder, as well as taking five wickets. She also played every match for London Spirit in The Hundred, scoring 46 runs and taking five wickets.

Gibson has also played for various England Academy and Development teams, beginning in 2014.

International career
In January 2023, Gibson was named in an England squad for the first time, as a travelling reserve for the 2023 ICC Women's T20 World Cup.

References

External links

2001 births
Living people
Sportspeople from Cheltenham
Gloucestershire women cricketers
Wales women cricketers
Western Storm cricketers
London Spirit cricketers